Gautam Vijaypat Singhania (born 9 September 1965) is an Indian industrialist. He is the chairman and managing director of the Raymond Group, the world's largest producer of suiting fabric.

Biography
Gautam Singhania was born in an  Marwari industrialist family, to Vijaypat Singhania and Ashabai Singhania.

He is an alumnus of St. Mary's School, Mumbai and Cathedral and John Connon School. He is also an alumnus of H.R. College in Churchgate, Mumbai

Gautam Singhania joined the Singhania family's JK Group of companies in 1986. He later joined the family's Raymond Group, becoming a director in 1990, the managing director in July 1999, and the chairman in September 2000. He restructured the group and sold Raymond's non-core businesses (synthetics, steel and cement). Under him, the group moved its focus to fabrics, apparel brands, prophylactics (KamaSutra condoms), and men's toiletries. He has also focused on international partnerships for Raymond, including joint ventures with UCO Textiles of Belgium (denim) and Gruppo Zambaiti of Italy (shirting). In 2005, Singhania opened a nightclub named Poison in Bandra, with DJ Aqeel.
As of 2012 Singhania's net worth is estimated to be around $1.4 Billion.  Singhania is currently constructing a skyscraper ten stories taller than the Antilia constructed by Mukesh Ambani. The 30 story mansion, called JK House, will be a combination of a private residence and textile showroom.

Personal life 
Gautam Singhania is married to Nawaz Modi Singhania, a Parsi. The couple has a daughter named Niharika (born 10th December 2005) 

He has suffered from vitiligo (loss of skin pigmentation) since a young age. Its progression accelerated when he was in his early 30s, as a side effect of medication.

Gautam Singhania's father gave him 27% of the company as per family understanding. After taking over the company a few years later he turned it around and turned it into a huge success.

Hobbies
Gautam Singhania is passionate about fast cars, boats, planes and nightclubs.  He has driven a Formula 1 car in France, a Ferrari 360 Modena in a road and track rally across Europe, and a Lamborghini Gallardo for Cannonball Run. He has also formed the first-ever Super Car Club in India. He owns a Tesla Model X that had been imported from the USA, at a time when Tesla cars were not available in India. He owns the only Gallardo LP570-4 Superleggera in India, and a pre-2008 Gallardo which has been modified to have over 1,600 horsepower. He also owns a Ferrari 458 Challenge racing car. He also owns a lot of drift cars, including an S15 Silvia, a 240SX, an E46 M3, a WRX STI, and a Lancer Evo VI. He also does drag racing in a heavily modified R33 Skyline GT-R with over 1,000 horsepower. He is very passionate about cars and has won many races in his sports cars. Singhania owns M Y Ashena, a tri-deck luxury yacht constructed entirely out of Burma Teak wood. The yacht was designed by traditional boat builders from a village in Gujarat. The Ashena was later used by Liz Hurley for her wedding. He also owns the luxury yacht Moonraker, which later sunk due to leaks caused by external damage However nobody aboard was harmed., launched 2014, his second of that name after the Moonraker launched 1992, as well as a traditional three-masted Arabian sailing dhow Shazma, four speedboats named after the James Bond movies Octopussy, Goldfinger, Thunderball, Golden Eye, and some other speedboats called Smokin Joe and Raymond. Singhania also owns a Bombardier Challenger 604 business jet (VT-NGS) and three helicopters.

References

Businesspeople from Mumbai
1965 births
Living people
Indian billionaires
Indian businesspeople in textiles
People with vitiligo